The cross product is a product in vector algebra.

Cross product may also refer to:
 Seven-dimensional cross product, a related product in seven dimensions
 A product in a Künneth theorem
 A crossed product in von Neumann algebras
 A Cartesian product in set theory

See also
 Cross-multiplication